The Exobasidiales are an order of fungi in the class Exobasidiomycetes. The order consists of four families as well as one genus, Cladosterigma, not assigned to any family.

References

Ustilaginomycotina
Basidiomycota orders
Taxa named by Paul Christoph Hennings
Taxa described in 1898